JBI, formerly known as the Joanna Briggs Institute, is an international research organisation which develops and delivers evidence-based information, software, education and training designed to improve healthcare practice and health outcomes. JBI works with universities and hospitals from across the globe through the JBI Collaboration. The JBI Collaboration is the largest global collaboration to integrate evidence-based healthcare within a theory-informed model that brings together academic entities with hospitals and health systems. JBI is based in Adelaide, South Australia.

Evidence-based healthcare 

JBI's approach considers the best available evidence, the context in which care is delivered, the individual patient and the professional judgement and expertise of the health professional. JBI regards evidence-based healthcare as a cyclical process. Global healthcare needs, as identified by clinicians or patients/consumers, are addressed through the generation of research evidence that is effective, but also feasible, appropriate and meaningful to specific populations, cultures and settings.

The JBI Model 

The JBI Model of Evidence-based Healthcare was developed in 2005 and updated in 2016.

It is described by reference to a pictogram, with one circle inside another. The 'inner circle' represents the pebble of knowledge while the 'inner wedges' provide the organisation's conceptualisation of the steps involved in the process of achieving an evidence-based approach to clinical decision-making. The 'outer wedges' operationalise the component parts of the model and articulate how they might be actioned in a pragmatic way.
The arrows indicate that the flow can be bi-directional.

Evidence-based practice resources 
JBI has developed evidence-based practice resources and publications which have been driven by the needs of health professionals and consumers worldwide.

Resources include the JBI Evidence Implementation Manual; JBI Evidence Synthesis Manual (JBI's comprehensive guide to conducting systematic reviews); and Critical Appraisal Tools (includes checklists for randomised control trials, qualitative research, economic evaluations and prevalence studies).

Other evidence-based practice resources and publications, such as JBI SUMARI, can be accessed via EBP Resources.

History 
JBI was established in 1996 by the Royal Adelaide Hospital and the University of Adelaide, and takes its name from Joanna Briggs, who was the first matron of the Royal Adelaide Hospital.

References

External links
 https://jbi.global
 The JBI Model of Evidence-based Healthcare YouTube
 A conversation with Alan Pearson AM with Dr Kylie Porritt YouTube

Medical and health organisations based in Australia
Organizations established in 1996
1996 establishments in Australia